Takeshi Yamada is a Japanese-American artist and rogue taxidermist.

Yamada was born Osaka, Japan, in 1960. He began painting at the age of 12, and decided to become an artist at 16. He was an international exchange student at the Osaka University of Arts before moving to the United States in 1983. He studied art at the California College of the Arts and the Maryland Institute College of Art, obtaining his Bachelor of Fine Art degree in 1985. In 1987, he obtained his Master of Fine Art from the University of Michigan School of Art & Design. He had exhibitions at the Neville-Sargent Gallery in Chicago in 1988 and 1991. In 1990, a series of 48 paintings entitled "Divine Comedy: New Orleans Mardi Gras" by Yamada were displayed in the Louisiana State Museum, and later some of them were shown in the Meguro Museum of Art, Tokyo. In 1993, he had a solo exhibition at the Lauren Rogers Museum of Art. He moved to New York City in 2000.

Yamada is a rogue taxidermist, creating fake creatures out of organic and inorganic materials. Some of his works have been displayed at the Coney Island Library.

References

External links

Page at the Minnesota Association of Rogue Taxidermists

Another 
Archived page at Sideshow World
Takeshi Yamada's Interview with the podcast Love + Radio

Osaka University of Arts alumni
California College of the Arts alumni
Maryland Institute College of Art alumni
Penny W. Stamps School of Art & Design alumni
American artists of Japanese descent
Taxidermists
1960 births
Living people
People from Osaka
Japanese emigrants to the United States